XHHD-FM is a radio station in Durango, Durango. Broadcasting on 100.5 FM, XHHD is owned by the Universidad Juárez del Estado de Durango.

History

The station signed on in 1976 as XEHD-AM 1270 and migrated to FM as part of the Mexican government's scheme to migrate stations from AM to FM.

In 2011, UJED signed a contract to allow a community radio station in Tayoltita, San Dimas Municipality, to retransmit its programs to serve the Primero Empresa Minera plant there. In 2015, this station received a regular concession and became XHPEM-FM 100.7.

References

Radio stations in Durango
Radio stations established in 1975
Mass media in Durango City
University radio stations in Mexico